In music, Op. 12 stands for Opus number 12. Compositions that are assigned this number include:
 Adès – Arcadiana
 Barber – Essay for Orchestra
 Beethoven – Violin Sonata No. 1
 Beethoven – Violin Sonata No. 2
 Beethoven – Violin Sonata No. 3
 Braunfels – Prinzessin Brambilla
 Dvořák – String Quartet No. 6
 Elgar – Salut d'Amour
 Korngold – Die tote Stadt
 Luigini – Ballet égyptien
 Mendelssohn – String Quartet No. 1
 Mendelssohn – String Quartets
 Nielsen – Hymnus amoris
 Pierné – Piano Concerto
 Rachmaninoff – Caprice bohémien
 Saint-Saëns – Oratorio de Noël
 Schumann – Fantasiestücke, Op. 12
 Sibelius – Piano Sonata in F major
 Vivaldi – Six Violin Concertos, Op. 12
 Ysaÿe – Poème élégiaque in D minor, Op.12